Christianity is a major religion in Nigerian Adamawa State which dominate only 50% of the total population . There have been people dying in Nigerian sectarian violence between Christians and Muslims. The state has the Roman Catholic Diocese of Yola as majority headed by Stephen Dami Mamza. Ekklesiyar ‘Yan’uwar a Nigeria – (Church of the Brethren) has its seat in the province. Deeper Life Bible Church and Living Faith Church are present in Yola. Most of the members of the Lutheran Church of Christ in Nigeria are in the state, with the headquarters being at Numan. Fellowship Baptist Conference of Nigerian Baptist Convention has its seat at Mubi and Gongola Baptist Conference-Ag of Nigerian Baptist Convention has its seat at Numan.
 Gombi, Golembatal, Uvu, Nokwam Nbulum, Wurobalka and Mubi have National Evangelical Mission churches.

See also 
Christianity in Kano State
Christianity in Sokoto State
Christianity in Borno State
Christianity in Jigawa State
Christianity in Kaduna State
Christianity in Katsina State
Christianity in Kebbi State
Christianity in Kwara State
Christianity in Niger State
Christianity in Ogun State
Christianity in Osun State
Christianity in Yobe State

References

Adamawa State
Adamawa